M. A. Chidambaram Stadium (MAC), also known as the Chepauk Stadium or simply Chepauk due its location in the city's locality of Chepauk, is a sports ground in Chennai, India that has hosted international cricket matches along with provincial games. Named after M. A. Chidambaram, former President of Board of Control for Cricket in India (BCCI), the venue was formerly known as the Madras Cricket Club ground. It has a capacity of 38,000 spectators for international matches. It is the home ground of the Tamil Nadu cricket team and the Indian Premier League team Chennai Super Kings. The first Test at this venue took place in 1934, between India and England. As of February 2021, it has hosted a further 33 Test matches. Chepauk has also staged 22 One Day International (ODI) matches, the first of which was in 1987 when Australia defeated India in a group-match during the 1987 World Cup.

In cricket, a five-wicket haul (also known as a "five-for" or "fifer") refers to a bowler taking five or more wickets in a single innings. This is regarded as a notable achievement. The first bowler to take a five-wicket haul in a Test match at Chepauk was Amar Singh for India against England in 1934; he finished the innings with bowling figures of 7 wickets for 86 runs. Australia's Ashley Mallett became the first to take two five-wicket hauls in the same match at Chepauk, when he took 5 for 91 and 5 for 53 in the second and fourth innings of the fifth Test of Australia's 1969–70 tour of India. Narendra Hirwani is the most recent cricketer and the first Indian to take two five-wicket hauls on debut. He took 8 for 61 and 8 for 75 against the West Indies during the fourth Test of the 1987–88 series between the teams, which was held at this ground, and finished the match with bowling figures of 16 for 136. These are also the best match-figures by any bowler on Test debut. The best figures in Test cricket at Chepauk are 8 for 55, taken by India's Vinoo Mankad against England in 1952. Axar Patel took the most recent five-wicket haul at Chepauk, with figures of 5 for 60 against England in their 2020–21 tour of India. As of February 2021, 32 bowlers have taken 51 Test match five-wicket hauls at this ground.

As of November 2017, two bowlers have taken five-wicket hauls during ODIs at Chepauk. The first player to do so was Aaqib Javed of Pakistan, who achieved the feat when he took 5 wickets for 61 runs against India during the 1997 Pepsi Independence Cup. The other five-wicket haul was made by West Indies' Ravi Rampaul, which is also the best figures in ODI cricket at this ground. He took 5 for 51 against India during the 2011 World Cup. As of November 2017, a match between India and New Zealand is the only Twenty20 International (T20I) to be held at the ground, which New Zealand won by one run. The best bowling figures in T20I cricket at Chepauk are Irfan Pathan's 3 wickets for 31 runs.

Key

Tests

One Day Internationals

Women's Twenty20 Internationals

Notes

References

External links

M. A. Chidambaram Stadium
Indian cricket lists